Bataan is a 1943 American black-and-white World War II film drama from Metro-Goldwyn-Mayer, produced by Irving Starr (with Dore Schary as executive producer), directed by Tay Garnett, that stars Robert Taylor, George Murphy, Lloyd Nolan, Thomas Mitchell, Desi Arnaz and Robert Walker. It follows the fates of a group of men charged with destroying a bridge during the doomed defense of the Bataan Peninsula by American forces in the Philippines against the invading Japanese.

Plot
The United States Army is conducting a fighting retreat. A high bridge—a wooden trestle on massive stone pillars—“spans a ravine on the Bataan Peninsula. After the Army and some civilians cross, an ad hoc group of thirteen hastily assembled soldiers from different units is assigned to blow it up and delay Japanese rebuilding efforts as long as possible. They dig in on a hillside. They succeed in blowing up the bridge, but their commander, Captain Henry Lassiter, is killed by a sniper, leaving Sergeant Dane in charge.

One by one, the defenders are killed, with the exception of Ramirez, who succumbs to malaria. Despite this, the outnumbered soldiers doggedly hold their position. Malloy shoots down an enemy aircraft with his Tommy gun before being killed. Dane and Todd creep up, undetected, on the bridge the Japanese have partially rebuilt and throw hand grenades, blowing it up.

Dane suspects that Todd is a soldier from his past named Danny Burns who was arrested for killing a man in a dispute, but escaped while Dane was guarding him.

Army Air Corps pilot Lieutenant Steve Bentley and his Filipino mechanic, Corporal Juan Katigbak, work frantically to repair a Beechcraft C-43 Traveler aircraft. They succeed, but Katigbak is killed and Bentley is mortally wounded. Bentley has explosives loaded aboard and flies into the bridge's foundation, destroying it for a third time.

The remaining soldiers repel a massive frontal assault, inflicting heavy losses and ultimately fighting hand-to-hand. Epps and Feingold are killed, leaving only Dane, Todd, and a wounded Purckett alive. Purckett is shot, while Todd is stabbed through the back by a Japanese soldier who had only feigned being dead. Before he dies, Todd admits to Dane he is Burns.

Now alone, Dane stoically digs his own marked grave beside those of his fallen comrades. The Japanese crawl through the ground fog near his position before opening fire and charging. Dane fires back; when his Tommy gun runs out of ammo, he switches to a M1917 Browning machine gun. He continually fires it directly into the camera lens as the end card reads: “So fought the heroes of Bataan, Their sacrifice made possible our victories in the Coral and Bismarck Seas, at Midway, on New Guinea and Guadalcanal. Their spirit will lead us back to Bataan!”

When the film was released, on June 3, 1943, the Allied offensive in the Pacific was a few months old. It would be a year and a half before the Battle to Retake Bataan  (January 31 to February 25, 1945).

Cast
 Robert Taylor as Sgt. Bill Dane, 31st Infantry
 George Murphy as Lt. Steve Bentley, United States Army Air Corps
 Thomas Mitchell as Cpl. Jake Feingold, 4th Chemical Company, Chemical Corps
 Lloyd Nolan as Cpl. Barney Todd (Danny Burns), Provisional Signal Battalion attached to the 26th Cavalry
 Lee Bowman as Capt. Henry Lassiter, 26th Cavalry
 Robert Walker as Musician 2nd Class Leonard Purckett, United States Navy
 Desi Arnaz as Pvt. Felix Ramirez, 194th Tank Battalion, California Army National Guard
 Barry Nelson as Pvt. Francis Xavier Matowski
 Phillip Terry as Pvt. Matthew Hardy, 12th Medical Battalion, Medical Corps (United States Army)
 Roque Espiritu as Cpl. Juan Katigbak, Philippine Army Air Corps
 Kenneth Spencer as Pvt. Wesley Epps, 3rd Engineer Battalion, Corps of Engineers
 Alex Havier as Pvt. Yankee Salazar, 4th Engineer Battalion, Philippine Scouts
 Tom Dugan as Cook Sam Malloy, Motor Transport Service

Production
The presence of a racially integrated fighting force prevented the film's showing in the American South.

Scenes from the 1934 RKO film The Lost Patrol, directed by John Ford, were reused in this production.

The film premièred in New York City on June 3, 1943.

Reception
Bosley Crowther, critic for The New York Times, described it as "a surprisingly credible conception of what that terrible experience must have been for some of the men who endured it", albeit with "melodramatic flaws and ... some admitted technical mistakes." In the end, "it doesn't insult the honor of dead soldiers".

The film was a hit when first released to theaters; according to MGM records it earned $2,049,000 in the US and Canada and $1,068,000 overseas, resulting in a profit of $1,140,000.

Home media
Bataan was released by Warner Home Video on Jan. 31, 2005 as a Region 1, double-sided DVD set that also contained the RKO Radio Pictures World War II feature film Back to Bataan (1945).

References

Bibliography

External links
 
 
 
 

1943 films
American black-and-white films
1940s English-language films
1940s war films
American war films
Films about the United States Army
Films directed by Tay Garnett
Metro-Goldwyn-Mayer films
Pacific War films
World War II films based on actual events
World War II films made in wartime
Films scored by Bronisław Kaper
Films set in the Philippines
Films with screenplays by Dudley Nichols
Japan in non-Japanese culture
Films with screenplays by Garrett Fort